Gurgel is a surname. Notable people with the surname include:

Fábio Gurgel (born 1970), Brazilian jiu-jitsu practitioner
João do Amaral Gurgel (1926–2009), Brazilian businessman
Jorge Gurgel (born 1977), Brazilian mixed martial artist 
Melissa Gurgel (born 1994), Brazilian designer, model and beauty pageant titleholder
Newton Holanda Gurgel (1923–2017), Brazilian Roman Catholic prelate 
Roberto Gurgel (born 1954), Brazilian prosecutor
Udo Gurgel (born 1938), German engineer and designer of luge, bobsled and skeleton tracks
Zoila Frausto Gurgel (born 1983), American professional female mixed martial artist and kickboxer